Testbourne Community School in Whitchurch, Hampshire, England, has been a secondary school since the Victorian era and is a foundation school. It educates around 900 students aged 11–16. The Headteacher is currently Jon Beck, who was appointed in September 2017.

Academic standards 
The school was rated as Outstanding by the school regulator Ofsted in its most recent inspection, which took place in November 2010 (up from Good in May 2007). The OFSTED inspectors praised the previous headteacher at this "exceptionally well-run school" for her "excellent leadership" and her "relentless focus on improving the school from its good quality at the last inspection".

Notable achievements 
The school was awarded the Artsmark Silver award in 2004. It previously had performing arts specialist status from 2005.

Kid Witness News 
Students have won several awards in the 'Kid Witness News' competition over the years. In May 2010, a video called B is for Apple won the award for Best Story at the European competition held in Hamburg. They had won the UK Grand Prix and UK Best Story-telling awards at the UK competition held in Derby earlier that month.

In 2009, students won the Global Citizenship Award at the International KWN finals in Japan for their video called Dansez What You Can’t Sez.

The following year, the student's film Won’t Listen Can’t Hear won 'best soundtrack' and came third overall (out of 626 schools worldwide).

Sport 
In June 2005, although the school has no dedicated rugby union pitch or posts, their U12 rugby team won its age-group final at The Daily Telegraph Emerging Schools Final at Twickenham in a competition involving 2,000 teams and 40,000 children across the United Kingdom.

References

External links 
 

Secondary schools in Hampshire
Foundation schools in Hampshire
Whitchurch, Hampshire